The Karate competition at the 2010 Central American and Caribbean Games was held in Mayagüez, Puerto Rico. 

The tournament was scheduled to be held from 23–25 July at the Wilfredo Toro Field in Porta del Sol.

Medal summary

Men's events

Women's events

References

External links

Central American and Caribbean Games
Events at the 2010 Central American and Caribbean Games
2010